Chelsea Life is a 1933 British drama film directed by Sidney Morgan and starring Louis Hayward, Molly Johnson and Anna Lee. It was shot at Elstree Studios as a quota quickie for release by the British subsidiary of Paramount Pictures.

Plot
A painter passes off another artist's work as his own and mixes in high society.

Cast
 Louis Hayward as David Fenner
 Molly Johnson as Lulu
 Anna Lee as Honourable Muriel Maxton
 Kathleen Saxon as Mrs. Bonnington
 Stanley Vilven as Grillini
 Gordon McLeod as Lawton Hodge
 Eric Hales as Harry Gordon
 Patrick Ludlow as Lancelot Humphrey
 Arthur Chesney as Ambrose Lincoln

References

External links

Bibliography
 Chibnall, Steve. Quota Quickies: The Birth of the British 'B' Film. British Film Institute, 2007.
 Low, Rachael. Filmmaking in 1930s Britain. George Allen & Unwin, 1985.
 Wood, Linda. British Films, 1927-1939. British Film Institute, 1986.

1933 films
1933 drama films
Films directed by Sidney Morgan
British drama films
Films set in London
British black-and-white films
British and Dominions Studios films
Films shot at Imperial Studios, Elstree
Paramount Pictures films
Quota quickies
1930s English-language films
1930s British films